Stewart Hoffman Appleby (May 17, 1890 – January 12, 1964) was an American Republican Party politician who represented  from 1925–1927, filling the vacancy of his father T. Frank Appleby, who had been elected to office but died before taking the seat.

Early life and career
Born in Asbury Park, New Jersey, Appleby attended the public schools of Asbury Park, and Mercersburg Academy. He graduated from Rutgers University, New Brunswick, New Jersey, in 1913 and afterward engaged in the real estate and insurance business.

Appleby organized and served as vice president of the First National Bank of Avon-by-the-Sea, New Jersey. During the First World War, he enlisted in the United States Marine Corps on May 17, 1917, and served until May 17, 1921. He was commissioned a captain in the United States Marine Corps Reserve on November 24, 1925.

Congress
Appleby was elected as a Republican to the Sixty-ninth Congress to fill the vacancy caused by the death of his father, Representative-elect T. Frank Appleby, and served from November 3, 1925, to March 3, 1927, but was not a candidate for renomination in 1926.

World War II and retirement
During World War II, Appleby served in the United States Coast Guard, being discharged in September 1945 as a coxswain.

He retired to Hallandale, Florida, and died in Miami, Florida, January 12, 1964. He was interred in Arlington National Cemetery, Fort Myer, Virginia.

External links

Stewart Hoffman Appleby at The Political Graveyard

1890 births
1964 deaths
Mercersburg Academy alumni
People from Asbury Park, New Jersey
People from Hallandale Beach, Florida
Rutgers University alumni
United States Marine Corps officers
Burials at Arlington National Cemetery
Florida Republicans
Republican Party members of the United States House of Representatives from New Jersey
20th-century American politicians
United States Marine Corps personnel of World War I
United States Coast Guard personnel of World War II
Military personnel from New Jersey